Willis Holly (July 4, 1854 – August 4, 1931) was secretary of the New York City Department of Parks and Recreation and a member of Tammany Hall. He entered politics in the administration of Mayor Hugh J. Grant, and became Mayor Thomas Francis Gilroy's secretary. He died on August 4, 1931 at his apartment at the Hotel Chelsea.

References

Leaders of Tammany Hall
1854 births
1931 deaths